Type 074A landing ship medium with NATO reporting name Yubei class is a new member of Type 74 series LSM, it is unique in that it is catamaran hull design. More than ten are in service by mid 2015, and this ship is the first LSM in PLAN to incorporate infrared stealth feature in that the exhaust is near waterline.  A speedboat launching / recovering facility is also added.  Type 74A LSM can carry 3 Type 96 or Type 59 tanks, or 6 Type 63 (tank)s, plus a platoon of 70 fully equipped troops, or 250 fully equipped troops.

References

Amphibious warfare vessel classes
Amphibious warfare vessels of the People's Liberation Army Navy